Birthday Point  is a bold, rocky headland which separates Pressure Bay and Berg Bay on the north coast of Victoria Land, Antarctica. The geographical feature was charted and named by the Northern Party, led by Victor Campbell, of the British Antarctic Expedition, 1910–13. The headland lies situated on the Pennell Coast, a portion of Antarctica lying between Cape Williams and Cape Adare.

References
 

Headlands of Victoria Land
Pennell Coast